Humberto Tapia Armenta (January 10, 1986 – March 29, 2011) was a Mexican professional boxer born in Tijuana, Baja California. He was in the Light Welterweight division and was the Inaugural WBC FECOMBOX Light Welterweight Champion.

Professional career
On October 23, 2006 Tapia beat title contender Ramón Montaño at the Palo Duro Golf Club in Nogales, Arizona. This bout was televised on TeleFutura.

WBC FECOMBOX Championship
In September 2007, Humberto won the Inaugural WBC FECOMBOX Light Welterweight Championship by beating the veteran Augusto Gamez at El Foro in Tijuana, Baja California, Mexico.

Legacy
Tapia fought and went the distance with many notable fighters like current WBA World Champion Brandon Ríos, Ramón Montaño, Rock Allen, Danny García, Carlos Molina, Michael Torres, Danny O'Connor, and Antonio Orozco.

Death
While training, Humberto was killed at the Hermanos Ulloa Gym in Tijuana. After a physical altercation with his boxing promoter, he pulled out a 9mm hand gun and shot Tapia.

References

External links
 

1986 births
2011 deaths
Mexican male boxers
Lightweight boxers
Light-welterweight boxers
Boxers from Baja California
Sportspeople from Tijuana
Deaths by firearm in Mexico
People murdered in Mexico
Male murder victims
Mexican murder victims